Francis Cornwall Sherman (September 18, 1805November 7, 1870) served as Mayor of Chicago, Illinois, for three terms (1841–1842, 1862–1865) as a member of the Democratic Party.

Early life
Sherman was born September 18, 1805 in Newtown, Connecticut. He married Electa Towbridge of Danbury, Connecticut.

Career in Chicago
Sherman arrived in Chicago on April 7, 1834. He built a small boardinghouse, and used those profits to buy a stagecoach, establishing a stage line from Chicago to Galena, Joliet, Peoria, and other towns in Illinois. In 1835, he began to work in brick manufacturing and construction.

In July 1835, he was elected a village trustee, serving for a year.

In 1837, he opened the City Hotel, 
a hotel that would be later renamed the Sherman House.

Also in 1837, after Chicago incorporated as a city, he was elected an alderman from the 2nd Ward on the newly created Chicago Common Council, and served for one year.

First mayoralty (1841–1842)
Sherman was elected mayor of Chicago in 1841, defeating Whig nominee Isaac R. Gavin.

Sherman was sworn in on March 4, 1841.

Sherman's first mayoralty ended on March 7, 1842 when he was succeeded by Whig Benjamin Wright Raymond.

City Treasurer, State Senate and Cook County Board of Commissioners
Sherman was City Treasurer of Chicago from 1842 through 1843.

Sherman served in the Illinois House of Representatives from 1844 through 1850. During this time, was a delegate to the 1847 Illinois constitutional convention.

In 1850, Sherman retired from his brickmaking venture, in order to focus himself on public service and developing the properties he owned. He expanded his hotel, adding two floors atop its existing three, and renaming it the "Sherman House".

Sherman served Chairman of the Cook County Board of Commissioners from 1851 through 1853.

Sherman ran in the contentious 1856 Chicago mayoral election as an anti-Nebraska Democrat. He lost to pro-Nebraska Democrat Thomas Dyer.

The Sherman House Hotel became one of the grand hotels of Chicago when it was reconstructed and reopened in 1861.

Second mayoralty (1862–1865)
Sherman was again elected mayor in the 1862 Chicago mayoral election, defeating Republican nominee Charles N. Holden.

Sherman was sworn in as mayor on May 5, 1862. That November, Sherman unsuccessfully ran for the United States House of Representatives, losing the Illinois 1st congressional district race to Republican Isaac N. Arnold.

Sherman appointed a committee that recommended a new city charter, which extended the terms of the mayor, treasurer, collector, city attorney, clerk of police court from one to two years, and also added the communities of Bridgeport and Hostein to the city's boundaries.

During his second mayoralty, Sherman and alderman John Comiskey had control over leading the Democratic bloc of the City Council, being opposed by the Republican bloc led by Charles C. P. Holden. Despite there being a slight Democratic majority (a 10 Democrat-10 Republican split, with Sherman able to cast tie-breaking votes), the city council was deadlocked in 1862 and early 1863. The deadlock became so severe, that between December 22, 1862 and March 23, 1863, no council meetings were held because Republicans refused to attend meetings, denying quorum. Republicans did so in hopes to avoid Democrats from taking actions that might undercut the Union effort in the ongoing American Civil War. The death of a Republican alderman and the absence of alderman Edward Solomon, who was fighting in the war, further decreased the Republican minority. On March 23, 1863, at the first meeting with a quorum in months, which was held to select election judges for the 1863 elections, Edward Solomon attended, surprising many, as he had not announced he would be able to attend. Furthermore, Democratic alderman Peter Shimp joined the Republicans in voting against Democrats, thus giving Republicans an effective majority at the meeting.

Sherman vetoed a number of "patriotic resolutions" that Charles C. P. Holden had passed in the city council.

Sherman was reelected mayor in 1863, very narrowly defeating the Republican nominee Thomas Barbour Bryan. This election was the city's first election to a newly extended term of two years. He was elected, in part, thanks to the new Irish-American and German-American population from Bridgeport and Holstein.

Sherman lost reelection in 1865, in a race that was won by Republican John Blake Rice after the race heavily turned in the Republican Party's favor with sentiments shifting following the assassination of Republican president Abraham Lincoln days earlier. Sherman's second mayoralty ended on May 3, 1865, when he was succeeded in office by Rice.

Subsequent career
Sherman would try again to win a fourth term as mayor in the 1867 Chicago mayoral election, running once again as the Democratic nominee, but once again losing to Republican John Blake Rice, the incumbent mayor.

Death
Sherman died November 7, 1870. He was buried at Graceland Cemetery.

Personal life
Sherman and this wife Electa had seven children together. Four of these children survived to adulthood.

Sherman's son, Francis Trowbridge Sherman, was a brigadier general in the Union Army during the Civil War.

References

External links
First Inaugural Address
Second Inaugural Address
Third Inaugural Address

1805 births
1870 deaths
People from Newtown, Connecticut
Businesspeople from Chicago
Burials at Graceland Cemetery (Chicago)
Chicago City Council members
Members of the Cook County Board of Commissioners
Democratic Party members of the Illinois House of Representatives
Mayors of Chicago
19th-century American politicians
19th-century American businesspeople